Guillon-Terre-Plaine is a commune in the Yonne department in Bourgogne-Franche-Comté in central France. It was established on 1 January 2019 by merger of the former communes of Guillon (the seat), Cisery, Sceaux, Trévilly and Vignes.

See also
Communes of the Yonne department

References

Communes of Yonne
Populated places established in 2019
2019 establishments in France